Logan Staats is a Canadian singer-songwriter and musician. Staats achieved mainstream success throughout 2018, and in 2019, off of his win on the first season of CTV's The Launch. He is best known for his single, "The Lucky Ones" which hit number one on the Canadian iTunes chart right after its release. He is also known for his part in the 2017 Canadian made documentary, When They Awake which celebrates Indigenous artists and their communities.

Early life 
Staats is Mohawk, born on Six Nations of the Grand River Territory and was raised in the nearby town of Brantford, Ontario. He started writing and performing music in his teens, playing the guitar and harmonica. Staats is well known in his local bars and through his live shows across Turtle Island. He has shared the stage with multiple well-known artists such as Buffy Sainte-Marie, Keith Secola, and Mumford and Sons.

From a young age, has been a fan of and inspired by Buffy Sainte-Marie.

Career

2015-2017 
Staats has acted in episodes of two television series; Guilt Free Zone (2015) and Urban Native Girl (2016) where he is credited as the musical performance.

He performed with the band Ghost Town Orchestra, which lead them to winning the award, "Best Rock Album" at the 2014 Aboriginal Peoples Choice Music Awards.

He released his first full-length album titled "Goodbye Goldia" on June 21, 2015.

When They Awake Documentary 
Staats was a part of Canadian documentary When They Awake, co-directed by P. J. Marcellino and Hermon Farahi, which was released in 2017. The film was created to bring awareness for Indigenous musical talent as well as awareness about the Indigenous communities throughout Canada. The film was released during the year of Canada 150 which was challenged by Indigenous people for Canada's history in colonialism, this film was produced with the intent to highlight the Indigenous people of Canada. Staats starred alongside other Indigenous talent including Wab Kinew, JB the First Lady, Tuk Siglit Drummers & Dancers, and Yellowknife Dene Drummers.

Staats filmed in his hometown of Brantford, Ontario, Canada where he met up with JB the First Lady where they explored parts of the town and jammed together.

Staats traveled with members and crew of the film for various screenings throughout Canada including Toronto, Regina, Peterborough and Owen Sound. He appeared and performed at The Calgary International Film Festival along with IsKwé, DJ Shub, JB the First Lady, and The North Sound.

2018: The Launch 
In September 2017, Staats was chosen out of ten thousand applicants and competed on the inaugural season of Canadian reality music competition show The Launch. He was a part of the series' premiere, which aired in January 2018, featuring a group of unsigned musical acts, competing to have their version of Busbee and Bebe Rexha-written song, "The Lucky Ones", released nationwide through Big Machine Records. Staats worked under the mentorship of music mogul, Scott Borchetta, superstar, Shania Twain, and producer and songwriter, Busbee who helped him improve overall as a singer and performer. Once selected the winner, Staats' rendition of the song was released on January 11, 2018.

Present 
Staat's released his latest single titled "Fear Of The Flame" on March 15, 2019.

He is currently working in a studio in Nashville, updating original pieces and hoping to complete another studio album.

Personal life 

Staats is passionate about his family, his music, and his community and believes that it is important to give back to the youth. He hopes that he can inspire young natives like how Buffy Sainte-Marie had inspired him through her teachings and song.

Shortly after winning the first episode of The Launch, Staats began visiting public schools in the Durham Region under the Durham District School Board to meet with Indigenous students. Staats' believes in an importance of young, impressionable Indigenous students to see someone of their ethnic background finding success in the music industry and wants to give them hope and the tools in order to believe in themselves and to pursue their dreams.

On December 4, 2017, Staats visited the Education Centre in Whitby, Ontario, Canada to speak with Indigenous youth and allies. The event was titled "Logan Staats Music Workshop" which included a group of students from six DDSB public high schools; O'Neill Collegiate and Vocational Institute, Eastdale Collegiate and Vocational Institute, G.L. Roberts Collegiate and Vocational Institute, Maxwell Heights Secondary School, Port Perry High School, and Brock High School. Staats spent his day sharing his story, performing for students as well as answering questions about his life and his booming music career and the experiences he has had.

Discography

Studio Albums 
 Goodbye Goldia (2015, 6ArrowsMedia)
 Running Like the River
 Vampires
 Simple Man
 Bright Lights
 Market Street
 Ash's
 Rain
 What You Love
 Pretty Little Liars
Tax Man

 A Light in the Attic (2023,  Red Music Rising)
 Ohén:ton Karihwaréhkwen (Words Before All Else)
 Running Like the River
 Holy Man
 California
 Deadman
 Codeine
 A Light in the Attic
 She Just Wants a Folk Song
 I Wish I Knew Your Name
 New Tattoo
 Six Miles

Collaborations 

 "Lightning in a Bottle", in collaboration with Chllly, featured on album titled Pariah (2015, Thru the RedDoor)

Singles and EPs 

 "She Just Wants a Folk Song" (2017, self-released)
 "The Lucky Ones" (2018, Bell Media, Inc. & Big Label Machine Label Group, LLC)
 "Fear Of The Flame" (2019, Big Machine Label Group, LLC & Bell Media, Inc.)

Awards and nominations

References 

Canadian pop singers
Canadian male singers
First Nations musicians
Living people
Year of birth missing (living people)